The Nutt House, initially titled The Nutty Nut, is a 1992 comedy film directed by Adam Rifkin. It stars Stephen Kearney, Traci Lords and Amy Yasbeck. It was also the last film for Emil Sitka, Sandra Gould and King Moody.

Plot
Identical twins Philbert and Nathan Nutt were separated at birth. Philbert is married to a wealthy heiress (Amy Yasbeck) with a mistress (Traci Lords) and a political campaign for President of the United States. Nathan suffers from a severe case of multiple personality disorder and has spent his life in a lunatic asylum. Nathan shows up on his brother's doorstep and what begins as a case of mistaken identity spirals out of control.

Cast
 Stephen Kearney as Philbert Nutt / Nathan Nutt
 Traci Lords as Miss Tress
 Amy Yasbeck as Diane Nutt
 Robert Trebor as Buddy
 Robert Colbert as Board Doctor
 Emil Sitka as Geeves
 Sandra Gould as Ma Belle
 Catherine Bach as Benefit Reporter

Production
Filming took place on location in Los Angeles, California in the summer of 1991. Creative tensions between director Scott Spiegel and one of the film's producers, Brad Wyman, resulted in Spiegel being replaced by another director, Adam Rifkin, three weeks into production. Wyman later stated that he regretted firing Spiegel and blamed it on the fact that he (Wyman) "wasn't a very good producer at the time." As a result, the writers of this film - Sam Raimi, Ivan Raimi, Bruce Campbell, and Scott Spiegel - were so embarrassed with the end result that they all used pseudonyms instead of their own names in the credits.

Release
The film was released theatrically in Germany on September 10, 1992 and was not released in the United States until the summer of 1995, where it was released directly to videocassette. Two DVD releases followed. The first in 1999, where it was released by Image Entertainment and the second in 2005, where it was released by Ardustry Entertainment. In Australia, it was released on VHS as The Nutty Nut.

Reception
Entertainment Weekly and TV Guide both panned The Nutt House, with the former writing that "the plot of The Nutt House, such as it is, serves merely as an excuse for uninspired slapstick that makes Pauly Shore look like Buster Keaton."

References

External links 
 

1992 films
Films directed by Adam Rifkin
Films with screenplays by Sam Raimi
American comedy films
American parody films
American fantasy comedy films
1990s English-language films
1990s American films